Joseph Pius Walaenisia is a politician of the Solomon Islands who had served as the last ambassador to Taiwan until the rupture of diplomatic relations between both parties, as well as Secretary to the Prime Minister. The Chinese version of his name is "王哲夫".

References

External links 
 Message from the Ambassador 

Solomon Islands politicians
Secretary to the Prime Minister of the Solomon Islands
Ambassadors of the Solomon Islands to Taiwan